Reddish South is an electoral ward in the Metropolitan Borough of Stockport. It elects three councillors to Stockport Metropolitan Borough Council using the first past the post electoral method, electing one councillor every year without election on the fourth.

It covers the southern part of Reddish, including parts of Heaton Norris and Heaton Chapel. Together with Reddish North it forms part of the Denton and Reddish Parliamentary Constituency.

Councillors
Reddish South electoral ward is represented in Westminster by Andrew Gwynne MP for Denton and Reddish.

The ward is represented on Stockport Council by three councillors: Liz Crix (Green), Janet Mobbs (Lab), and Gary Lawson (Green).

 indicates seat up for re-election.

Elections in the 2010s

May 2022

May 2021

May 2019

May 2018

May 2016

May 2015

May 2014

May 2012

May 2011

References

External links
Stockport Metropolitan Borough Council

Wards of the Metropolitan Borough of Stockport